Fermina Express, Corporation (FermEx) is a commuter bus company servicing Metro Manila. The company is under the umbrella of Mencorp Transport Systems Incorporated.

History 
Fermina Express started in 1996 with services within Metro Manila that plies over EDSA corridor, and has a connecting service from Cubao and Pasay to the cities of Dagupan and San Carlos in Pangasinan and Cuyapo in Nueva Ecija via Paniqui, Tarlac. The bus line uses NLEX for northbound trips with a stopover at Mabalacat Bus Terminal (Dau). Connecting via SCTEX, the bus exits at Concepcion then towards Tarlac City with another stopover along MacArthur Highway. The bus then proceeds to its final destination.

In 2008, Fermina was meted a one-month preventive suspension by the Land Transportation Franchising and Regulatory Board after one of its buses was involved in a collision that killed five people. In 2011, Fermina was identified by the Metro Manila Development Authority (MMDA) as among the bus firms with the most traffic violations for the year.

In 2014, a burning Fermina bus that was abandoned by its driver and conductor started a fire that razed a truck and four stores along Commonwealth Avenue, Quezon City. That same year, a Fermina bus was hit in the rear by another city bus, which injured at least 22 people.

In 2015, Fermina's provincial routes were taken over by JAC Liner Inc. Despite the change in management, JAC Liner retained the Fermina Express name, but the buses were repainted to match JAC Liner's livery. Its provincial routes were eventually incorporated into JAC Liner's subsidiary Pangasinan Solid North Transit, Inc.

Fleet

Fermina fields Almazora, Higer, Wuzhoulong, Yutong, and Golden Dragon buses for its fleet.
 Higer KLQ6119E3
 Golden Dragon XML6103J12
 Yutong ZK6119H
 King Long XMQ6118JB
 Wuzhoulong FDG6110B
 Wuzhoulong FDG6110EC3

Destinations

Under EDSA Carousel
 Ayala Avenue, Makati
 Baclaran, Parañaque
 Ninoy Aquino International Airport Terminal 1 & 2
 Parañaque Integrated Terminal Exchange, Parañaque
 Cubao, Quezon City
 SM Mall of Asia, Pasay

Under Route 5
 Eton Centris*
 SM City Fairview, Quezon City*
 San Jose Del Monte, Bulacan*
 Angat, Bulacan*

(*) shared routes with Fairview Bus

Former destinations 

 Mabalacat, Pampanga (Mabalacat Bus Terminal)
 Tarlac City, Tarlac
 Cuyapo, Nueva Ecija
 Bayambang, Pangasinan
 Dagupan 
 Malasiqui, Pangasinan
 San Carlos City, Pangasinan
 Alabang, Muntinlupa.

See also
 Dagupan Bus Co, Inc.
 JAC Liner
 List of bus companies of the Philippines

References

External links
 http://gingldg.blogspot.com/2008/08/travelling-fast-with-ferminas-express.html
 http://wikimapia.org/12954411/tl/Fermina-Express-new-Terminal
 http://www.gmanews.tv/largevideo/latest/31042/QTV-LTFRB-suspends-franchise-of-Fermina-Express

Bus companies of the Philippines
Companies based in Quezon City
1987 establishments in the Philippines